Mighty Servant 1 is a 29,000-ton heavy-lift ship capable of carrying very large vessels and offshore platforms. Built for Dutch shipping firm Wijsmuller Transport, which merged in 1993 with Dock Express Shipping to become Breda-based offshore heavy lifting group, Dockwise Shipping B.V. Mighty Servant 1 carried structures such as oil rigs and floating drydocks.

Service

See also
Mighty Servant 2
Mighty Servant 3

References

External links
Mighty Servant 1 hauling a Navy drydock 
Photos of sister ship Mighty Servant 2 hauling USS Samuel B. Roberts (FFG 58)
Photos of the wreck of sister ship Mighty Servant 2
Mighty Servant 1 at Dockwise Shipping
Dockwise Shipping B.V.
Mighty Servant leaving for sea

Semi-submersibles
Heavy lift ships
Ships of the Netherlands
Ships built by Oshima Shipbuilding